The Welterweight class in the 1st AIBA African Olympic Boxing Qualifying Tournament competition was the lightest class.  Welterweights were limited to those boxers weighing between 64 - 69 kilograms.

list of boxers

Medalists

Results

Quarterfinal Round

Semifinal Round

3rd place Round

Final Round

Qualification to Olympic games

References
AIBA 

AIBA African 2008 Olympic Qualifying Tournament